Jan Suchan (born 18 January 1996) is a professional Czech football midfielder currently playing for Vlašim.

He made his career league debut for 1. FK Příbram on 24 October 2014 in a Czech First League 3–1 home win against Baník Ostrava.

References

 Nabídka od Plzně se neodmítá, shodují se talentovaní Matějů a Suchan, fotbal.idnes.cz, 2 June 2015
 Plzeň zbrojí dál, z Jihlavy získala talentovaného záložníka Kučeru, fotbal.idnes.cz, 15 June 2015
 Hubník se vrací z Olomouce do Plzně, ta v zimě neplánuje nakupovat, fotbal.idnes.cz, 10 December 2015
 Vlašim posílí Jan Suchan, fcsbvlasim.cz, 30 January 2022

External links 
 
 Jan Suchan official international statistics
 

Czech footballers
Czech expatriate footballers
1996 births
Living people
Czech First League players
Slovak Super Liga players
Czech National Football League players
FC Viktoria Plzeň players
1. FK Příbram players
FK Teplice players
FK Senica players
MFK Karviná players
MFK Vítkovice players
FC Slavoj Vyšehrad players
Expatriate footballers in Slovakia
Czech expatriate sportspeople in Slovakia
Association football midfielders
Sportspeople from Příbram
Czech Republic youth international footballers
Czech Republic under-21 international footballers
FC Sellier & Bellot Vlašim players